The Navigator, written by Zadok Cramer and first published in 1801, was a guide for settlers and travelers moving westward into or through the interior of the United States during the first half of the 19th century.

Its subject matter is described on its title page:

Cramer enlarged, corrected and expanded it through 12 editions in 25 years.  Though priced at one dollar it was very popular.  

The eighth edition was published in 1814, contained 369 pages, as well as dozens of maps detailing the navigable waterways and all their hazards.  

In 1966 a facsimile version of the eighth edition was printed and bound in hardcover by Readex Microprint Corporation, and was assigned the Library of Congress Catalog Card number 66-26332.

References

Who's Who on the Ohio River and its Tributaries, (Cincinnati 1931) by Ethel C. Leahy. Pages 79–81
Historic Highways of America (Cleveland 1903) by Archer B. Hulbert. Pages 73–99

External links
 The Navigator available at the Internet Archive
 Zadok Cramer at the National Mississippi River Museum and Aquarium
 Essay about Zadok Cramer and his Navigator

Travel guide books
1801 non-fiction books
Exploration of North America